Stop All the World Now is the second full-length album by American singer-songwriter Howie Day. It was recorded at Olympic Studios in London over three months in early 2003 and released by Epic Records on October 7, 2003. Day chose Martin Glover as a producer, known for producing the Verve's Urban Hymns.
 
The working title for the album was ... from a Northern Sky, a line from the song "Come Lay Down". The final title, Stop All the World Now, is a lyric from the song "I'll Take You On".

Recording
The album saw Day for the first time being backed by a permanent band. Stop All the World Now was recorded with guitarist Jay Clifford from Jump, Little Children, the Verve bassist Simon Jones, Los Angeles multi-instrumentalist Les Hall and London drummer Laurie Jenkins. The songs "Numbness for Sound", "I'll Take You On", "Collide", and "She Says" were accompanied by the London Philharmonic Orchestra.

Several tracks were co-written with Jay Clifford, lyricist Peter Zizzo and Better Than Ezra frontman Kevin Griffin. The song "She Says" already appeared on his previous album, Australia, but was re-recorded accompanied by a 25-piece orchestra and mixed by Chris Lord-Alge. This version is also known as "She Says (Chris Lord-Alge Mix)".

Promotion and reception

On September 27, 2003, a full band tour began to promote the album. Due to other commitments, Simon Jones was unable to tour with the group and was replaced by Jeremy Curtis.

After its release the record received lukewarm reactions. Rolling Stone's author Pat Blashill referred to the album as "[...] not bad. It's tender and well-felt and pretty. But [...] the music feels indistinct, even sorta impersonal." Devon Powers from PopMatters noted that "Stop All the World Now is an album you have a crush on, not one you fall deeply, complexly, and foolishly in love with. And crushes have a way of disappearing suddenly, without a trace."

Sales of Stop All the World Now were initially sluggish, but slowly began to rise beginning in late 2004 with the single release of the ballad "Collide", which became a popular radio hit and was featured on TV shows such as Scrubs, One Tree Hill, and Third Watch as well as being used in the promotion of the movies Pride & Prejudice and The Perfect Man.

Stop All the World Now was finally certified gold by the RIAA on May 20, 2005. The single "Collide" was also certified gold on September 15, 2005. The fan favorite "She Says" was re-recorded and  released as a single early 2005. Even though this single was more successful than the original single release in 2004, which failed to enter the U.S. charts, the re-record was unable to achieve the same success as "Collide".

Editions
Concurrently with the normal release a limited edition was released along with a bonus DVD with footage of Day recording his album in London. A Japanese edition containing 2 bonus tracks was also released. On November 16, 2004 a special edition of the album was released, featuring a new album cover, 2 bonus tracks, an acoustic version of "Collide" and a live recording of "Brace Yourself". On May 31, 2005 a DualDisc edition was released with the album in high fidelity audio on a Super Audio CD, video clips of "Collide", "Brace Yourself" and "Perfect Time of Day", live videos of the songs "Bunnies" and "Ghost", and several other extras.

Originally 16 songs were recorded for Stop All the World Now, of which 11 made it to the original release. Three more songs were released as bonus tracks on the special and Japanese edition of the album. The songs "Madrigals" and "Enemy" remain unreleased.

Track listing
 "Brace Yourself" (Howie Day, Jay Clifford) – 3:40
 "Perfect Time of Day" (Day, Kevin Griffin) – 4:21
 "Collide" (Day, Griffin) – 4:09
 "Trouble in Here" (Day, Peter Zizzo) – 5:57
 "Sunday Morning Song" (Day, Griffin) – 3:57
 "I'll Take You On" (Day, Clifford) – 5:38
 "She Says (Chris Lord-Alge Long mix)" (Day) – 4:40
 "Numbness for Sound" (Day) – 3:51
 "You & a Promise" (Day, Clifford) – 6:24
 "End of Our Days" (Day, Zizzo) – 4:22
 "Come Lay Down" (Day, Clifford) – 5:52

Special edition

  "This Time Around" (Day) – 5:11
  "Standing in the Sun" (Day) – 5:41
  "Brace Yourself (Live and acoustic)" (Day, Clifford) – 3:50
  "Collide (Acoustic)" (Day, Griffin) – 4:37

Japanese edition
  "Standing in the Sun" (Day) – 5:41
  "So, Goodbye" (Day) –  4:46

Personnel
 James Clifford – guitar, background vocals
 Howie Day – acoustic guitar, piano, vocals
 Les Hall – organ, synthesizer, guitar, piano, harmonium, tamboura, mellotron, vibraphone, wurlitzer
 Mark Heaney – drums
 Laurie Jenkins – percussion, drums
 Simon Jones – bass
 London Philharmonic Orchestra - strings

Record charts

References

Sources

2003 albums
Howie Day albums
Albums produced by Youth (musician)
Epic Records albums